USS Crowley (DE-303) was an  of the United States Navy during World War II. She was sent off into the Pacific Ocean to protect convoys and other ships from Japanese submarines and fighter aircraft. She performed escort and antisubmarine operations in dangerous battle areas and returned home with five battle stars.

Namesake
Thomas Ewing Crowley was born on 18 April 1902 in Madison, Illinois. He enlisted in the Navy on 6 March 1919 and was discharged on 31 January 1923. A member of the United States Naval Reserve, he was commissioned assistant dental surgeon from 23 December 1929 and served at naval stations at Great Lakes, Illinois, San Diego, California, Guantanamo Bay, Cuba and Lakehurst, New Jersey, as well as at sea. Lieutenant Commander Crowley was killed in action during the Japanese Attack on Pearl Harbor on 7 December 1941.

Construction and commissioning
Crowley was launched on 22 September 1943 by Mare Island Navy Yard; sponsored by Mrs. T. E. Crowley, widow of Lieutenant Commander Crowley; commissioned on 25 March 1944 and reported to the Pacific Fleet.

World War II Pacific Theater operations 
Departing San Francisco, California, on 25 May 1944, Crowley arrived at Pearl Harbor on 31 May and joined in anti-submarine training exercises in Hawaii until 12 August. Escorting a convoy, she arrived at Guadalcanal on 25 August, and with another convoy reached Manus on 14 September.
 
Between 15 September and 18 November 1944, Crowley sailed out of Manus escorting shipping to the Palau Islands during the invasion and consolidation, with occasional voyages to Humboldt Bay, New Guinea, and the Solomons. On 26 September she joined  in giving assistance to the merchant ship  rescuing her survivors and bringing her fires under control to save her war cargo.
 
Crowley based at Ulithi from 21 November 1944, joining a logistics group supporting the fast carrier task forces. Until 1 February 1945 she escorted oilers to the ocean rendezvous at which they replenished the carrier forces striking Luzon, Formosa, and the China coast, then operated with the oilers in the assault on Iwo Jima until 22 March.
 
Departing Ulithi on 22 March, Crowley arrived at Guam on 9 April and continued escorting oilers during the Okinawa operations until 18 June. From 3 July to the end of hostilities Crowley supported the 3rd and the 5th Fleet raids on the Japanese home islands. On similar logistics duty for the occupation forces, Crowley arrived at Sagami Wan, Honshū, on 9 September.

End-of-War decommissioning 
Crowley departed Tokyo Bay on 16 September 1945 and arrived at San Francisco on 8 October. Crowley was decommissioned on 3 December 1945 and sold on 21 December 1946.

References

External links

 

 

Evarts-class destroyer escorts
World War II frigates and destroyer escorts of the United States
Ships built in Vallejo, California
1943 ships